is a Japanese former professional tennis player. Most time of her career, she played on the ITF Women's Circuit.

In June 2009, she reached her highest singles ranking of 297 by the Women's Tennis Association (WTA). In July 2010, she reached her best WTA doubles ranking of 219.

ITF Circuit finals

Singles: 2 (2–0)

Doubles: 23 (13–10)

References

External links
 
 

1986 births
Living people
People from Hyōgo Prefecture
Sportspeople from Hyōgo Prefecture
Japanese female tennis players
20th-century Japanese women
21st-century Japanese women